Alexandra Kotur is an American author and fashion journalist. Kotur is the creative director at Town and Country magazine after having previously been style director of U.S. Vogue. Kotur is an international taste-maker and member of the International Best-Dressed List. She is the sister of Fiona Kotur Marin, an American accessories designer.

Background and career
Alexandra Kotur grew up on the Upper East Side of Manhattan, New York City, graduating from The Chapin School.  Kotur graduated from Middlebury College with a degree in art history.

Upon graduation, Kotur moved to London, working in the PR department of Ralph Lauren and then at British GQ as an assistant to fashion director Jo Levin.  In 1995, Kotur returned to New York to work for Vogue, serving as an assistant to European editor Hamish Bowles.  She wad the style director and a contributing editor at U.S. Vogue.

Kotur is the author of Carolina Herrera: Portrait of a Fashion Icon (2004) and co-author (with Hamish Bowles) of The World in Vogue: People, Parties, Places (2009).

Kotur is a member of the International Best-Dressed List.

List of works
 Caroline Herrera: Portrait of a Fashion Icon (2004)
 The World in Vogue: People, Parties, Places (2009)

References

American magazine editors
American socialites
Chapin School (Manhattan) alumni
American fashion journalists
Living people
Middlebury College alumni
People from the Upper East Side
Vogue (magazine) people
Year of birth missing (living people)
American women journalists
Women magazine editors
21st-century American women